Ulundi Local Municipality is a local municipality located on the southern boundary of the Zululand District Municipality in northeastern KwaZulu-Natal, South Africa. It is a mainly rural municipality that encompasses the town of Ulundi.

Population characteristics 
Recent surveys have identified the following characteristics of the municipality's population:

More than half the population is younger than 19 years of age, placing pressure on the need for social facilities. A significant number of these children will be orphaned due to HIV/AIDS.

At least 12% of the population (27 450 people) are already infected with HIV/AIDS. Population growth is expected to decline over the next 20 years.

Education levels are very low; 29% of the population has no formal education.

Income levels are very low; nearly 40% of households have no income.  Unemployment levels are very high, with only 12.5% of the total population being formally employed.

The population is predominantly Zulu in ethnicity and culture.

Places of interest 
The tourism potential of the area remains largely undeveloped; however, the area features a number of activities and places of interest. These include game reserves, historical/cultural sites, cultural events and  guest lodges.  Game reserves include the Hluhluwe-Umfolozi Parks, the Ophathe Game Park, the Emakhosini (Valley of the Zulu Kings), the planned Emakhosini-Ophathe Conservancy, and the ThakaZulu Game Reserve.  Historical/cultural sites include Nodwengu (King Mpande’s residence and grave), Ulundi Battlefield, Amafa and Dingaan Stat/Piet Retief’s grave.

Main places
The 2001 census divided the municipality into the following main places:

Politics 

The municipal council consists of forty-seven members elected by mixed-member proportional representation. Twenty-four councillors are elected by first-past-the-post voting in twenty-four wards, while the remaining twenty-three are chosen from party lists so that the total number of party representatives is proportional to the number of votes received. In the election of 1 November 2021 the Inkatha Freedom Party (IFP) won a majority of thirty-two seats on the council.

The following table shows the results of the election.

References

External links 

 

Local municipalities of the Zululand District Municipality